Alessandra Cernuschi (born 13 January 1997) is an Italian former pair skater. With partner Filippo Ambrosini, she is the 2015 Bavarian Open silver medalist and finished tenth at the 2015 European Championships.

Programs 
(with Ambrosini)

Competitive highlights 
GP: Grand Prix; CS: Challenger Series (began in the 2014–15 season); JGP: Junior Grand Prix

With Ambrosini

Single skating

References

External links 

 

1997 births
Italian female pair skaters
Living people
Figure skaters from Milan
20th-century Italian women
21st-century Italian women